The Ohio House Committees are the legislative sub-organizations in the Ohio House of Representatives that handle specific topics of legislation that come before the full House of Representatives. Committee membership enables members to develop specialized knowledge of the matters under their jurisdiction.

Agriculture & Rural Development

Armed Services, Veterans Affairs and Public Safety

Community & Family Advancement

Commerce & Labor

Economic & Workforce Development

Education

Energy & Natural Resources

Finance & Appropriations

Financial Institutions, Housing and Urban Development

Government Accountability & Oversight

Health & Aging

Insurance

Judiciary

Local Government

Public Utilities

Rules & Reference

State Government

Transportation & Infrastructure

Ways & Means

References

Links
The Ohio House of Representatives

Government of Ohio
Ohio law
Ohio General Assembly